Three Men and a Baby is a 1987 American comedy film directed by Leonard Nimoy. It stars Tom Selleck, Steve Guttenberg, and Ted Danson as three bachelors as they attempt to adapt their lives to de facto fatherhood with the arrival of the love child of one of the men. The script was based on the 1985 French film  (Three Men and a Cradle).

The film was the biggest American box office hit of that year, surpassing Fatal Attraction and eventually grossing $167 million in the United States and Canada and $240 million worldwide. The film won the 1988 People's Choice Award for Favorite Comedy Motion Picture. The success of the movie launched a franchise.

Plot
Architect Peter Mitchell, satirist Michael Kellam, and actor Jack Holden are happy bachelors in their shared NYC apartment, with frequent parties and flings. One day, a baby named Mary arrives on their doorstep with a note revealing she is the result of Jack’s tryst with an actress named Sylvia during a Stratford Festival Shakespearean production a year prior.

Jack is in Turkey shooting a movie, and makes arrangements with a director friend to have a package delivered to the apartment. Jack asks his roommates to keep the delivery a secret per his friend's wishes; when Mary arrives, they believe she is the "package".

Peter and Michael are totally befuddled how to care for Mary, and Peter leaves to buy supplies. Their landlady Mrs. Hathaway delivers a small box – the actual "package" of heroin – which Michael tosses aside. They learn to care for Mary, including diaper changes, baths, and feedings.

Four days later, two drug dealers arrive at the apartment for the package. Peter and Michael mistakenly give them Mary, along with a can of powdered milk the dealers believe is the heroin. Peter discovers the actual package; realizing the mix-up, he runs downstairs but trips, spilling the package's contents. He gathers up the drugs and confronts the men outside, causing a scuffle. A police officer on horseback intervenes; Peter rescues Mary, but the dealers flee with the can of powdered milk. The officer detains Peter and Michael at the apartment until Sgt. Melkowitz, a narcotics officer, arrives to question them. Jack calls from Turkey, but Peter and Michael are unable to talk openly as they are being recorded. They successfully hide the drugs, learning that Jack's friend Paul Milner is a drug dealer. A suspicious Melkowitz puts them under surveillance.

Mrs. Hathaway babysits Mary while Peter and Michael go to work. Returning home, they find Mrs. Hathaway bound and gagged and the apartment ransacked by the dealers, but Mary safe; a note threatens, "Next time we'll take the baby". Peter and Michael continue to care for Mary, adjusting to 'fatherhood' and growing attached.

Peter incapacitates an intruder, who turns out to be Jack, returning early after his movie role was cut. Jack assures Peter and Michael he knew nothing about the heroin. He initially denies his connection to Mary, but Sylvia's note convinces him he is Mary's father. Peter and Michael pass all parenting responsibility to Jack, who quickly grows to love her.

They receive a news clipping in the mail – Milner has been attacked by the drug dealers and hospitalized – with another threat: "Don't let this happen to you!" Peter, Michael, and Jack formulate a plan to trap the dealers, arranging a meeting. Jack, disguised as a pregnant woman, leaves the building with Mary, while Peter and Michael leave in a cab, followed by undercover officers, but manage to lose them in another cab driven by Jack. The three meet the dealers at the top floor of a construction site. Michael, hidden in the vents, records Peter's conversation with the dealers but falls into the room, and a chase ensues. They manage to trap the dealers in an elevator as the police arrive. With the recording, they prove their innocence to Melkowitz, and the dealers are arrested.

Peter, Michael, and Jack fully embrace their role as Mary's guardians, until Sylvia arrives to take Mary with her to London. After she leaves with Mary, the three realize how desperately they miss the baby. Racing to the airport, they just miss Sylvia's plane for London. Defeated, they return home to find Sylvia and Mary at the door. Sylvia tearfully says she doesn't want to give up acting but must if she has to raise Mary alone. They invite her and Mary to move in; she accepts, and the four live happily with the baby.

Cast

Production
Mary was played by twins Lisa and Michelle Blair.

The soundtrack included the Peter Cetera song "Daddy's Girl", which was used for the movie's big music montage sequence, the Miami Sound Machine song "Bad Boy", which opened it, and the John Parr song "The Minute I Saw You", which ended the film.

Urban legend

Just over an hour into the final cut of the film, there is a scene that shows Jack and his mother (played by Celeste Holm) walking through the house with Mary. As they do so, they pass a background window on the left-hand side of the screen, and a black outline that appears to resemble a rifle pointed downward can be seen behind the curtains. As they walk back past the window 40 seconds later, a human figure can be seen in that window. A persistent urban legend began circulating August 1990 (shortly before the sequel, Three Men and a Little Lady, premiered) that this was the ghost of a boy who had been killed in the house where the film (or this scene) was filmed. The most common version of this myth was that a nine-year-old boy committed suicide with a shotgun there, explaining why it was vacant: because the grieving family left. This notion was discussed on the first episode of TV Land: Myths and Legends in January 2007, and was referenced in "Hollywood Babylon", a second-season episode of the TV series Supernatural.
   

The figure is actually a cardboard cutout "standee" of Jack, wearing a tuxedo and top hat, that was left on the set. It was created as part of the storyline, in which he, an actor, appears in a dog food commercial, but this portion was cut from the final version of the film. The standee does show up later in the film, when Jack stands next to it as Sylvia comes to reclaim Mary. Snopes.com contends that the one in the first scene looks smaller than it does in the later scene because of the distance and angle of the shot, and because the curtains obscure its outstretched arms. As for the contention that a boy died in the house, all the indoor scenes were shot on a Toronto sound stage, and no kind of residential dwellings were used for interior filming.

Reception

Critical response
The critical response to Three Men and a Baby was generally positive. On Rotten Tomatoes the film holds an approval rating of 67% based on reviews from 70 critics. The site's consensus reads: "Like the French farce it's based on, Three Men and a Baby is too self-satisfied with scatalogical humor to qualify as a bundle of joy, but the role of makeshift daddy brings out the best in Tom Selleck". Metacritic gave the film a score of 61 based on 16 reviews, indicating "generally favorable reviews". Audiences polled by CinemaScore gave the film an average grade of "A−" on an A+ to F scale.

Roger Ebert of the Chicago Sun-Times, despite noting several aspects he saw as flaws, praised the film, remarking: "Because of Selleck and his co-stars... the movie becomes a heartwarming entertainment". He gave it 3 (out of four) stars. Janet Maslin of The New York Times wrote "this story is about four babies, not just one" and "the film bubbles along in a funny if predictable way, with a lot more gags than the earlier film managed".

Box office
The film opened in theaters on Wednesday, November 25, 1987. It grossed $168 million in the United States and Canada and $72 million internationally for a worldwide gross of $240 million. It was notable for the Walt Disney Studios since it was the first production from the studio to gross over $100 million domestically in its initial run and its highest-grossing film at the time until surpassed in 1990 by Pretty Woman. It was the highest-grossing film of 1987 domestically, with an estimated 42 million tickets sold in the US.

Sequel

The film was followed by a 1990 sequel titled, Three Men and a Little Lady.

Future
In 2010, a third film titled Three Men and a Bride was in development. The sequel project entered development hell and was eventually abandoned in favor of a reboot.

Reboot
In December 2020, the as-of-yet untitled reboot was announced to be in development, with Zac Efron cast in a starring role. The film is intended to be a streaming exclusive film, for Disney+. Maurice "Mo" Marable was chosen to direct the reboot. By April 2022, Marable stated that the script is nearing completion. The filmmaker said that the project will pay homage to the originals, while introducing a mixed-race cast. He also intends for the stars of the original films to appear in the movie, with a cameo role at minimum.

Adaptations

The TV show Baby Daddy, an American sitcom that premiered in 2012 on ABC Family, was inspired by the film. The series follows Ben, living with his elder brother Danny and close friend Tucker, who raise a baby left at their door. Six seasons were produced, with the final episode airing in 2017.

This film also served as inspiration for other adaptations, and was remade in several regions:
 Balache Baap Brahmachari (1989) in Marathi
 Thoovalsparsham (1990) in Malayalam
 Chinnari Muddula Papa (1990) in Telugu
 Thayamma (1991) in Tamil
 Asathal (2001) in Tamil
 Heyy Babyy (2007) in Hindi

See also
 My Two Dads (1987)
 3 Godfathers (1948)
 Baby Daddy (2012)

References

External links
 
 
 
 
 
 

1980s American films
1980s buddy comedy films
1980s English-language films
1987 comedy films
1987 films
American buddy comedy films
American remakes of French films
films about babies
films about drugs
films about parenting
films directed by Leonard Nimoy
films set in New York City
films set in Turkey
films scored by Marvin Hamlisch
films shot in Toronto
Interscope Communications films
Touchstone Pictures films